The Marconi Railway was a  long narrow gauge railway with a gauge of  at the Marconi Wireless Station near Clifden in the Irish County Galway.

Location 

The route ran from the gate of the site over bog and rocks to the main buildings of the Marconi Wireless Station. There was a turntable at each end of the track, of which ruins are still visible. There were no passing loops on the single line track. Several manually operated cranes along the route could be used to load peat onto the waggons, which was used as fuel for the on-site power station.

History

Construction and inauguration 

The track and the steam locomotive were designed and built from 1905 to 1907 by Dick, Kerr & Co. in Scotland. Initially it was used to transport construction material and electrical equipment. On 17 October 1907, the first passengers were transported to the Wireless Station. Later it became useful for transporting peat to the power station and for passenger transport of employees and visitors.

Well-known passengers 
The pilots John Alcock and Arthur Whitten Brown, who had crash-landed on 14/15 June 1919 after the first 16-hour trans Atlantic non-stop flight, drove with the Lancia railcar from the capacitor building to the receiving house and the social club.

Closure 
The railway operated from 1907 to 1922. When the Marconi Wireless Station burnt down in 1922 due to political unrest, the locomotive and waggons became useless. Subsequently, the railway line was taken out of use, lifted and probably scrapped.

External links 
  Amanda Crowley: Gugliemo Marconi – Connecting the World. Vie Magazine.
  CRHnews - Marconi's World First Wireless Telegram Service Clifden. BBC.

References 

2 ft gauge railways in Ireland
Defunct railroads
Rail transport in Ireland